Emerson Collective is a for-profit corporation focused on education, immigration reform, the environment, media and journalism, and health. Founded by Laurene Powell Jobs, this limited liability company (LLC) uses philanthropy, impact investing, advocacy, and community engagement as tools to spur change in the United States and abroad. They purport to engage in philanthrocapitalism.

History
Emerson Collective was founded in 2004 by Laurene Powell Jobs in Palo Alto, California. Named after transcendentalist writer Ralph Waldo Emerson, the organization says its mission is to do the greatest amount of good for the greatest number of people.

In 1997, Powell Jobs had co-founded, together with Carlos Watson, the nonprofit organization College Track, a college completion program to combat the achievement gap among students of color.  When Emerson Collective was established in 2004, grants and investments largely focused on the education sector. When Powell Jobs began learning more about the challenges plaguing immigrant students, particularly those whose undocumented status made it difficult to attend college, Emerson Collective broadened its portfolio to include immigration reform and advocacy.

Powell Jobs and Emerson Collective were strong advocates of the creation of President Barack Obama's Deferred Action for Childhood Arrivals (DACA) program and have continued to push for permanent legislation to provide "Dreamers" with a path to citizenship. In October 2016, she wrote the article "Immigrants Fuel Innovation. Let's Not Waste Their Potential" for WIRED.

In 2015, Emerson Collective's Managing Director of Education Russlynn H. Ali launched the affiliate XQ Institute, a nonprofit dedicated to rethinking American public high school.

In 2015, Emerson Collective became the lead investor in education technology company Amplify.

In 2016, Andy Karsner joined Emerson Collective to launch Emerson Elemental, a practice dedicated to investments in the environmental and clean energy space. Karsner previously served in the United States Department of Energy as Assistant Secretary for Energy Efficiency and Renewable Energy.

In 2016, former U.S. Secretary of Education Arne Duncan joined Emerson Collective to launch Chicago CRED, a nonprofit committed to curbing gun violence in Chicago through counseling, training, and matching young men with jobs.

In 2017 and 2018, Emerson Collective supported the immigration-focused work of the artist JR, and helped bring Alejandro González Iñárritu's Academy Award-winning, virtual reality experience Carne Y Arena to Washington, D.C.

In 2019, Emerson Collective led a round of funding for Boom Supersonic, an aerospace company that aims to make supersonic commercial flight a realization again, and its proposed 55-passenger business-class transport.

In recent years the organization has expanded its reach into art, film, and media, journalism, sports, and other creative ventures.

Media investments and donations
Emerson Collective was an investor in Ozy, and one of its first backers.

On September 1, 2016, Emerson Collective invested in series A funding for Axios Media, a news website focusing on business, technology, politics and media trends.

On July 28, 2017, Emerson Collective became the majority owner of The Atlantic, purchasing the majority stake from Atlantic Media's David G. Bradley. The outlets owned by Emerson Collective include The Atlantic magazine and its digital properties along with its standout events line, AtlanticLIVE, and its consulting division, Atlantic 57. The Washington Post reports Emerson Collective plans to move to full ownership of The Atlantic in "three to five years" after their  investment.

On August 1, 2017, Gimlet Media, the podcasting startup behind the shows StartUp, Reply All and Homecoming, announced that it had raised a new round of financing from investors including the Stripes Group and the Emerson Collective.

In 2018, Emerson Collective acquired the parent of California Sunday and Pop-Up Magazine.

Emerson Collective has donated money to Mother Jones.

References

External links
 
 Official Twitter Account

Organizations based in Palo Alto, California
Foundations based in the United States
Organizations established in 2004